Bible translations into the languages of Indonesia and Malaysia have a lot of common history up until the modern era. Apart from the shared Malay language which historically was the lingua franca of the Malay archipelago and forms the basis for the national languages of Indonesia and Malaysia today, portions of the Bible have been translated into a variety of indigenous languages in the region.

The translation of the Bible into the Malay language was one of the first extant translations of the Bible in an East Asian language.

Albert Cornelius Ruyl, a Protestant first translated the Gospel of Matthew in 1612 into the Malay. This was followed by the translation of the Gospel of Mark in 1638. The full Canonical Gospels and the Acts of the Apostles was revised and published in 1651 by Justus Heurnius, the chaplain of Batavia. The main early Translators of the Bible into the Malay language were Melchior Leydekker, H. C. Klinkert, and W.G. Shellabear. Leydekker was appointed to the ministry of the Dutch churches at Batavia in 1678.

The 3 volume Leydekker translation in the Jawi script was published by J. Willmet in 1824.

Today, there are more than 112 indigenous languages in use in Malaysia, while indigenous Indonesian languages consist of more than 701 languages.

Languages of Indonesia

In addition to Indonesian, bible translations (complete or partial) also available in more than 70 languages of Indonesia, some could be accessed online. 
In 2020, Jehovah's Witnesses published 4 complete bible translation into Batak Toba, Batak Karo, Javanese, and Nias language, also 1 NT translation into Sundanese.

Indonesian

Since Indonesia gained its independence, there have been at least ten Bible translations made, due to the rapid changes in the Indonesian language; every few years each translation's language becomes outdated. The most widespread translation used by Indonesian speakers right now is the Terjemahan Baru, or "New Translation" (1974), published by LAI ("Lembaga Alkitab Indonesia," or Indonesian Bible Society).

List of modern (1945 onward) translations:
Alkitab Terjemahan Lama (1958): called the Old Translation after the New Translation (1974) came out. Before that it was the only translation in the Indonesian language. However, it was not an original translation; rather, it was a combined translation from Klinkert's Old Testament (1879), in Malay language, and Bode's New Testament (1938) also in Malay language, which was called "an emergency publication"
Alkitab Bouma/Ende (1968): first Catholic translation in Indonesian language by P.Y. Bouma, printed in Ende, Flores, Nusa Tenggara Timur
Alkitab Terjemahan Baru (1974): first fresh Protestant translation in Indonesian language by Indonesian Bible Society's team of translators, printed in Jakarta
Alkitab Kabar Baik (BIS) (1985): first dynamic translation in Indonesian language (since Terjemahan Baru was translated in formal Indonesian) by IBS, based on Today's English Version
Firman Allah Yang Hidup (1989) by Yayasan Kalam Hidup: printed in Bandung, this translation is based on The Living Bible, and paraphrased by a team led by Dr. Ganda Wargasetia
Kitab Suci Terjemahan Dunia Baru (Edisi 1999) - Based on English edition of the New World Translation of the Holy Scriptures released in 1984, produced by Jehovah's Witnesses.
Kitab Suci Injil (2000): a revision of 1912 Malay New Testament by Shellabear, printed side-by-side with its Greek text
Kitab Suci Komunitas Kristiani (2002) by Yayasan OBOR: a new Catholic translation, printed in Jakarta
Alkitab Versi Mudah Dibaca (2005) by World Bible Translation Center: a new translation based on the Easy to Read Version
Indonesian Literal Translation (2008) by Yayasan Lentera Bangsa: a new translation aimed primarily at the wording of "Yahweh" instead of "Allah" (used in every other Indonesian Bible)
Wasiat Baru - King James Indonesia (2011): a new translation based on the King James Version and other English versions such as the New International Version
Kitab Suci Terjemahan Dunia Baru (Edisi 2017) - This Bible is based from the English 2013 revision of the New World Translation of the Holy Scriptures, replacing the previous Indonesian edition released in 1999, produced by Jehovah's Witnesses.

Languages of Java

Javanese

Gottlob Brückner (1783–1857) translated the Bible into Javanese language, the largest local language of Indonesia, in 1820.
Brückner Bible: printed 1829 in Serampore
Gericke Bible: 1848
Janz Bible: 1893
Indonesian Bible Society: 1994 (OT and NT in Today Java's Version) and 2006 (NT in Javanese Formal Translation)
Kitab-Kitab Yunani Kristen Terjemahan Donya Anyar (New World Translation of the Christian Greek Scriptures): 2018, produced by Jehovah's Witnesses.

Sundanese
J. Esser translated the Matthew into Sundanese language of western Java (1854). Then G.J. Grashuis translated Luke in 1886. In 1877, the whole New Testament was finished by Sierk Coolsma, and followed by the whole Bible in 1891. Coolsma also published some books of the NT in Arabic script (Jawi script) in 1871.

Languages of Kalimantan
Dayak Ngaju translation was the first bible translation into languages of Kalimantan (NT 1846, OT 1858). It was done by J. F. Becker and A. F. A. Herdeland and reviewed by Timotheus Marat and Nikodemus Tomonggong. The new Dayak Ngaju translation was published by the LAI in 1999. LAI also published translations in other Kalimantan languages, such as Ot Danum language (NT 1997) and Ma'anyan language (NT 1996).

Languages of Sulawesi

Buginese 
B.F. Matthes (1818–1908) translated the Bible into Bugis language of southern Sulawesi (1863 Matthew, 1888 NT, 1901 OT) and Makassar language (1864 Matthew, 1888 OT, 1900 NT).

Sangir 
E.T. Steller (1834–1897) translated the Bible into Siau language (1883 NT) and Sangir language of northern Sulawesi (1942 NT).

Languages of Sumatra

Batak Toba
Ludwig Ingwer Nommensen (1834 - 1918), of the Rhenish Mission Society, translated the Bible into Batak Toba of northern Sumatra (1878 in Batak script and 1885 in Latin script)

Jehovah's Witnesses also translate their Bible in Batak Toba. It is called Bibel Hata ni Debata tu Angka Jolma na Naeng Mangolu di Tano na Imbaru (Mateus-Pangungkapon), which based from the Christian Greek Scriptures of the English revision of the New World Translation of the Holy Scriptures released in 2013.

Languages of Malaysia

Malay (1612)

After Malaya became independent in 1957, a radical transformation occurred in the use of Malay in Christian literature. The original thrust had been two-fold, to work amongst the Peranakan Chinese and the Malays. The former had no longer become dependent on Baba Malay literature as the younger generation started becoming more conversant in English while legal and social considerations had essentially halted evangelistic work amongst the Malays, especially in Malaya (and to a lesser extent in Singapore).

The emphasis shifted from providing literature in the Malay language to one that would provide literature in the Malaysian language, a standardised form of Malay in Malaysia, for future generations who would be educated in the language. The Malay Language Committee of the British and Foreign Bible Society auxiliary in Singapore, the Bible Society of Malaya was phased out in the 1960s and was replaced by the National Language Committee. The Bible Society of Malaya was re-constituted as the independent Bible Society of Singapore, Malaysia and Brunei (BSSMB) in 1969 and continued the work of the originating Bible society.

The first translation in Bahasa Malaysia was published in 1987 by the Bible Society of Singapore, Malaysia and Brunei as the Alkitab Berita Baik. This was followed by a revision in 1996 by the Bible Society of Malaysia.

A formal equivalence translation of the Bible was published in 2015 and is known as the Alkitab Versi Borneo. This is the first formal translation of the Bible in Bahasa Malaysia since Malaya became independent.

Iban (1864)

Portions of the Bible in the Iban language (Ethnologue: iba) spoken by the Iban people (also known as the Sea Dayak) of Sarawak was first translated in the 19th century. In 1864, the Gospels of Matthew and Mark was published by the Society for the Promotion of Christian Knowledge. In 1933, the full New Testament was published by the British and Foreign Bible Society.

A new translation of the whole Bible in Iban known as the Bup Kudus was initiated in 1988 and published in 2001 by the Bible Society of Malaysia. This was revised and published as the Bup Kudus Baru in 2011.

Bau Bidayuh (2020) 

The New Testament in the Bau Bidayuh language (Ethnologue: sne) spoken by the Bidayuh people (also known as the Land Dayak) of Sarawak was published by the Bible Society of Malaysia in 2020. The New Testament is known as Kitab Janyji-Sipokat De Bauh. The print and audio format of the New Testament was dedicated and launched on 23 February 2020 in Bau, Sarawak.

Biatah Bidayuh (1887)

Portions of the Bible in the Biatah language (Ethnologue: bth) spoken by the Bidayuh people (also known as the Land Dayak of Sarawak was first translated and published in 1887 by the Society for the Propagation of the Gospel. A complete New Testament was published by the Bible Society of Malaysia in 1963.

A complete revision of the New Testament called the Simanya Bauh was published by the Bible Society of Malaysia in 2003. A complete Bible was published in 2014 by the Bible Society of Malaysia and is known as Buk Kudus.

Baba Malay (1913)

A New Testament in Baba Malay (Ethnologue: mbf) used by the Straits Chinese was translated and published in 1913 by W. G. Shellabear. The Bible Society of Singapore did a reprint of the Baba Malay New Testament in 2007 as there were no longer any copies of the original printing available for native speakers of the language to use.

Semai (1935)
Earlier referred to as the Sengoi language, portions of the Bible was translated as early as 1935 and published in 1951. The book of Luke was revised and published as a diglot with the Semai language (Ethnologue: sea) and Bahasa Malaysia text shown side-by-side in 2012 by the Bible Society of Malaysia. Work remains ongoing for the translation of the whole Bible into the Semai language. Three volumes were released in 2019: Volume 1: Genesis, Ruth, and Jonah; Volume 2: The four Gospels and Acts; Volume 3: 1 & 2 Thessalonians, 1 & 2 Timothy, Titus, Philemon.

Kayan, Baram (1990) 
A translation of the Bible into Kayan, Baram language (Ethnologue: kys) spoken by the Kayan people of Sarawak has been available since 1990 and was first published by the Bible Society of Singapore, Malaysia and Brunei. Work is on-going for a revision of the Bible in the Kayan language.

Kenyah (1971)

A translation of the New Testament in Mainstream Kenyah (Ethnologue: xkl) spoken by the Kenyah people of Sarawak and East Kalimantan have been available since 1971 and was first published by the Bible Society of Singapore, Malaysia and Brunei. Work has been ongoing since 2002 for a translation of the whole Bible by the Kenyah Translation Committee with technical support and assistance in linguistics, translation and software from the Summer Institute of Linguistics.

Penan (1974)

Translations of portions of the Bible in the Penan language (Ethnologue: pez) spoken by the Penan people have been available since 1974. A complete New Testament in Western Penan language (Ethnologue: pne) was completed and published in 2011 and is known as the Rengah Jian.

Kadazandusun (1975)
While translations of portions of the Bible in the Dusunic languages have existed since 1975, work to translate a new translation of the Bible in the standard Kadazandusun language spoken by the Kadazan people of Sabah was initiated in 2001. Known as the Buuk Do Kinorohingan, it was published in 2007 by the Bible Society of Malaysia.

Labuk Kinabatangan (1995) 

The New Testatment in the Labuk Kinabatangan language (Ethnologue: dtb) is known as the Buuk do Pongojonjian di Kavavagu was published by the International Bible Society in 1995.

Lun Dayeh / Lun Bawang (1982)

The Bible in the Lun Dayeh language (Ethnologue: lnd) known as the Bala Luk Do' was first translated and published in 1982 by the Bible Society of Singapore, Malaysia and Brunei. It was the first whole book published in the language of the Lun Bawang people who reside in the interior border region between Sabah, Sarawak, and Kalimantan. A revision of the Bala Luk Do''' was completed and published in 1998.

Murut Timugon (1998)

The New Testament in Murut Timugon (Ethnologue: tih) spoken by the Murut people of Sabah was published in 1998 by the Bible Society of Malaysia. It is called the Nabantuan Bagu. The full Bible known as the Tanou Moonsoi Timugon was published in 2013 also by the Bible Society of Malaysia in both a Catholic and Protestant version.

Tahol / Tagal Murut (2003)

The Bible in the language of the Murut people (Ethnologue: mvv) of southwestern Sabah and northeastern Sarawak known as the Rahu Nu Tuhan Aho Onsoi was published in 2003 by the Bible Society of Malaysia. The New Testament was published by the Philippine Bible Society in 1991 and is known as the Rahu Nu Tuhan. 

 Tombonuo (2002) 

The Bible in the Tombonuo language (Ethnologue: txa) of northern Sabah  known as the Tinongaran Nu Kinoringan'' was published in 2002 by the Bible Society of Malaysia.

References

External links
  Today's Malay Version
  History Alkitab Berita Baik
Biblia malaïce, Volume 1 by Jean Willmet 
Biblia malaïce, Volume 2 by Jean Willmet  
Biblia malaïce, Volume 3 by Jean Willmet

Indonesia
Christianity in Indonesia
Languages of Indonesia
Christianity in Malaysia
Languages of Malaysia